Danilo's pupil (14th century) was a talented monk who wrote the biography of Danilo II between 1337 and 1340. He is credited with  compiling the biographies written by Danilo II in a collection, and he added his biography of Stefan Uroš III and the "Life of Archbishop Joanikije I," written by a monk from the Monastery of Sopoćani. He also left some information concerning the first few years of the rule of Stefan Dušan, the mightiest of the Nemanjić Serbian rulers, and the only one who was not named a saint by the Serbian Orthodox Church. His name is unknown to us, though professing anonymity was not uncommon for monks in medieval Serbia. Names of some monk scribes are difficult to come by because of their dedication to their craft of writing and because their spirituality did not permit them to disclose their name or take any credit for their work. Some would only give their first name, and occasionally some, like those from the Rača monastery, used the name of their monastery as a surname.

Danilo's pupil wrote along the same lines as Danilo II, describing the life of his teacher after 1337, and presenting only the spiritual life and ecclesiastical calling of his master.

His works excel for their artistic and stylistic qualities. He had a keen sense of the dramatic and his narration is vivid and exciting. He was unable to completely avoid the stock phrases and epithets common in hagiographic literature of the time, however, the realistic detail in his works is unusually abundant for the period. In addition, "The Lives of Serbian Kings and Archbishops" (Животи краљева и архиепископа српских)  constitutes a valuable source for political and religious life in Serbia during the Nemanjić ascendency.

His depiction of the attack of the Catalans on Mount Athos monasteries is also a unique descriptive record of timely history.

References 

 Serbian monks
 Archbishops of Serbs
 Nemanjić dynasty
 Hagiographers
 Eastern Orthodox royal saints
14th-century Serbian historians
History of Eastern Orthodoxy